This is a list of individual records recognized by the Premier Hockey Federation through the end of the 2019–20 season. Jillian Dempsey currently holds the all-time PHF records for games played, goals, assists, and points. On Sunday, January 26, 2020, Jillian Dempsey became the first player in league history to reach 100 career points, including playoffs. She reached the century mark with an assist in a win versus the Minnesota Whitecaps.

Most goals

Most assists

Most points

Most games

Most penalty minutes

Most goaltending wins

See also

 PHF awards
 List of Boston Pride records
 List of Buffalo Beauts records
 List of Connecticut Whale (PHF) records
 List of Minnesota Whitecaps records

References

External links 
 Record Book

Records
Records